Cape Helles is the rocky headland at the southwesternmost tip of the Gallipoli peninsula, Turkey. It was the scene of heavy fighting between Ottoman Turkish and British troops during the landing at Cape Helles at the beginning of the Gallipoli campaign in 1915.
The name derives from the Greek Helle; Helles means "Helle's" in Greek (see also Hellespont).

It is now the site of one of the main memorials of the campaign, the Helles Memorial, maintained by the Commonwealth War Graves Commission, particularly for those that were part of British and Indian forces (rather than ANZAC forces) fighting there and have no known grave.

References

Helles, Cape
Landforms of Çanakkale Province
Gallipoli Peninsula